Frederick "Rikky" von Opel (born October 14, 1947) is a former racing driver who represented Liechtenstein in the Formula One World Championship, the only driver to have done so. He won the Lombard North British Formula 3 Championship in 1972. He participated in 14 Formula One World Championship Grands Prix for the Ensign and Brabham teams, debuting on July 1, 1973.  He scored no championship points.

Formula One career

1973

Opel's Formula One debut coincided with that of the team that provided him with his big break, Ensign. Both began at Paul Ricard in France, the eighth race of the 1973 season, with Opel qualifying his N173 25th and finishing 15th, three laps down. Great Britain was next, while Opel finished 13th, six laps down, after starting from 21st.

More promising signs appeared to be on the horizon at Zandvoort for the Dutch Grand Prix where he qualified a very creditable 14th, ahead of former World Drivers' Champions Emerson Fittipaldi and Graham Hill. However, on the morning of the race, cracks were found in the chassis. With too little time to make repairs, Opel was unable to start and the same issues prevented the team from starting in Germany too. Fuel system issues curtailed Opel's Austrian Grand Prix where he qualified 19th, and an overheating engine ended his Italian Grand Prix, after qualifying 17th.

The North American climax offered little better; he qualified 26th and last in Canada and was unclassified in the race, finishing 12 laps down, whilst in that year's United States Grand Prix he once again qualified dead last, 27th, and retired on the opening lap with his throttle jammed open.  Opel's debut season produced no points, and he was unclassified in the Drivers' Championship.

1974
Ensign's car for the new season, the N174, was much like the N173, but at the opening round of 1974 in Argentina, Opel discovered how little progress had really been made. He qualified 26th, again dead last, more than seven seconds slower than pole-sitter Ronnie Peterson and almost one and a half seconds slower than Guy Edwards, who qualified 25th. The handling of the car was so flawed that he chose to withdraw from the meeting. Shortly afterwards Opel quit the team.

He sat out the races in the Brazilian Grand Prix and South Africa until he took over the second Brabham seat from Richard Robarts, starting with the Spanish Grand Prix. Their BT44 was powered by the same Cosworth DFV V8 as the Ensign, but the chassis was far superior, so hopes were raised.
However, Opel could not make the most of it and he struggled to match the performance of new teammate, Argentine Carlos Reutemann.

Retiring with an oil leak in Spain, after qualifying 24th, and again a fortnight later in Belgium with a blown engine, from which he started 22nd, were not the lift in performance Opel wished for. Monaco was worse still, where he was the only driver that failed to qualify. Brief respite was found in Sweden and the Netherlands with his first top-10 finishes, 9th on both occasions (after qualifying 20th and 23rd respectively).

The promise was short-lived though, as failure to qualify next time out in France was the final straw for Brabham boss Bernie Ecclestone, and Opel was replaced by Carlos Pace. For the second year running he was unclassified in the Driver's Championship with no points. A little over a year after his debut, the career of Liechtenstein's only Formula One driver was over.

Personal life
He is the son of Fritz von Opel and a great-grandson of Adam Opel, the founder of the German car-maker Opel. His mother is Von Opel's second wife, Emita Herrán Olozaga, the daughter of a Colombian diplomat. He was born in the United States and lived in St. Moritz, Switzerland during his youth - often secretly challenging his cousin Gunter Sachs and friend Alexander Onassis to flat-out midnight bobsled runs at the St. Moritz-Celerina Olympic Bobrun. He chose to represent Liechtenstein in racing despite having no connection to the country, and proclaimed before one of his Grands Prix that "When I win, I want to hear the German national anthem".

After his stint in Formula One, Von Opel retired to a Buddhist monastery in rural Thailand and became a monk. His exact whereabouts are unknown and his only contact with the outside world comes in the form of a post office box, the location of which is known by only a select few of his acquaintances.

Results

Complete Formula One World Championship results
(key)

See also

References

External links
8w article

1947 births
Living people
Brabham Formula One drivers
British Formula Three Championship drivers
Ensign Formula One drivers
Liechtenstein Formula One drivers
Liechtenstein racing drivers
Rikky